Type 22 tobacco is a classification of United States tobacco product as defined by the U.S. Department of Agriculture, effective date November 7, 1986. The definition states that type 22 tobacco is a type of fire-cured tobacco, known as Eastern District fire-cured, produced principally in a section east of the Tennessee River in southern Kentucky and northern Tennessee. Most type 22 tobacco in northern Tennessee is grown in Robertson and Montgomery County.

Type 22 is harvested, stripped and hung inside curing barns and a fire is set to provide optimum conditions for curing the product for sale. Incidentally, several barns are lost to fire each year, usually representing a substantial loss for the grower.

References
 USDA Standards for Type 22 tobacco
 USDA Tobacco Briefing Room
 Slide show from University of Kentucky and University of Tennessee on Dark Tobacco Production, includes type 22 tobacco

Tobacco in the United States
1986 introductions
United States Department of Agriculture